Breakfast at Tiffany's may refer to:

 Breakfast at Tiffany's (novella), 1958 novella by Truman Capote
 Breakfast at Tiffany's (film), 1961
 Breakfast at Tiffany's: Music from the Motion Picture, by Henry Mancini
 Breakfast at Tiffany's (musical), a 1966 Broadway musical
 Breakfast at Tiffany's (play), 2009 or 2016
 "Breakfast at Tiffany's" (song), by Deep Blue Something, 1995

See also
 Tiffany (disambiguation)